Arthur Drabble (12 February 1864 – 28 July 1931) was a New Zealand cricketer. He played four first-class matches for Otago between 1884 and 1892.

Drabble was born in Wales at Llandudno. His family migrated to New Zealand and he was educated at Otago Boys' High School in Dunedin. He worked as a farmer.

References

External links
 

1864 births
1931 deaths
New Zealand cricketers
Otago cricketers
People from Llandudno
Sportspeople from Conwy County Borough